Washington has 9 Executive seats, all elected at large.  In 2004, all 9 positions were up for reelection.

Governor

After a machine and manual recount, Christine Gregoire won the election by 133 votes.

Lt. Governor

Secretary of State

State Treasurer

State Auditor

Attorney General

Polling

Results

Commissioner of Public Lands

Superintendent of Public Instruction

Insurance Commissioner

See also
2004 Washington gubernatorial election

Notes

References

Executive